Nationalist and Conservative Party is a Turkish nationalist and conservative political party founded in 2010. The party received 0.09% of the vote in the 2011 general election.

2010 establishments in Turkey
Conservative parties in Turkey
Nationalist parties in Turkey
Political parties established in 2010
Political parties in Turkey
Turkish nationalist organizations

The Party is Based In Türkiye